Lieutenant-General Sir Noel Monson de la Poer Beresford-Peirse KBE, CB, DSO (22 December 1887 – 14 January 1953) was a British Army officer.

Family background
Beresford-Peirse was the son of Colonel William John de la Poer Beresford-Peirse and Mary, daughter of Thomas Chambers of Aberfoyle, County Londonderry. He was educated at Wellington College, Berkshire and at the Royal Military Academy, Woolwich and commissioned into the Royal Artillery. Beresford-Peirse was great-grandson to Adm. John Beresford, and a cousin to the Beresford-Peirse baronets.

He was married three times. The first marriage (in 1912) was to Hazel Marjorie, daughter of J.A. Cochrane, Riverina, Australia. The marriage ended in divorce in 1924. The second marriage (in 1925) was to Jean, only child of Surgeon-Captain R.D. Jameson, CMG, RN. Jean died in 1926. In 1929 he married Katharine Camilla, daughter of Colonel James Morris Colquhoun Colvin, VC. All three marriages were childless.

Military career
Beresford-Peirse was commissioned into the Royal Artillery in 1907. He served in the First World War in, briefly, Egypt in 1914 then Mesopotamia back to Egypt and finally France and Belgium. He was Mentioned in Dispatches and awarded the Distinguished Service Order in 1918. After the First World War and after attendance at the Staff College, Camberley from 1924 to 1925, until 1929, he performed a number of roles in the Royal Artillery in France and Britain. There were then staff and administrative posts in the UK until 1935. In 1937, Beresford-Peirse was posted to India for "special duties" and subsequently he served two years as an instructor at the Senior Officers' School, Belgaum in India. He was Brigadier in the Royal Artillery, Southern India Command during 1939 and 1940 and Aide-de-Camp to King George VI in 1939 and 1940.

At the beginning of the Second World War Beresford-Peirse was the Commander of Artillery for the Indian 4th Infantry Division, which at the time was based in Egypt. He was promoted to command the division in August 1940 and led it in North Africa (Operation Compass) and Sudan (the East African Campaign).

In March 1941 he was knighted via Knight Commander of the Order of the British Empire (KBE) and on 14 April 1941 he was given command of the Western Desert Force (later redesignated XIII Corps). He commanded the British forces in Sudan from October 1941 to April 1942 when he was put in command of the Indian XV Corps and then, from June 1942, the Southern Army in India until 31 March 1945.

Beresford-Peirse was Welfare General of the India Command between April 1945 and 1946. He retired on 13 June 1947, joining the Regular Army Reserve of Officers, and died in 1953.

Notes

References

External links
The Peerage Web Site
British Army Officers 1939–1945
Generals of World War II

 

|-
 

1887 births
1953 deaths
British Army lieutenant generals
Irish military personnel
Royal Artillery officers
Companions of the Distinguished Service Order
Companions of the Order of the Bath
Knights Commander of the Order of the British Empire
British Army personnel of World War I
British Army generals of World War II
People educated at Wellington College, Berkshire
Graduates of the Royal Military Academy, Woolwich
Sudan Defence Force officers
Graduates of the Staff College, Camberley
20th-century Anglo-Irish people
Beresford family